Cape Cod style was a style of lighthouse architecture that originated on Cape Cod in Massachusetts during the early 1800s, and which became predominant to the West Coast, where numerous well-preserved examples still exist. In such lighthouses, the light tower was attached directly to the keeper's dwelling, and centered on the roof; entry was achieved through a stairway in the top floor of the dwelling. 

No lighthouses built in the Cape Cod style exist today on the East Coast.  The original Alcatraz Island Light, the first lighthouse to be built on the West Coast, was built using this style.

See also
Cape Cod (house)

References

External links
 Old Point Loma Lighthouse, a Cape-Cod-style structure

American architectural styles